Pathri (Assembly constituency)  is one of four constituencies of the Maharashtra Vidhan Sabha located in the Parbhani district.

It is a part of the Parbhani (Lok Sabha constituency) along with five other assembly constituencies, viz Jintur, Parbhani and Gangakhed from Parbhani district and Partur and Ghanasawangi from Jalna district.

Along with whole Pathri taluka, Pathri Assembly constituency also includes whole of Manwath and Sonpeth taluka.

Current(2014–2019) representative from this constituency in Maharashtra state assembly is Mohan Fad who was independent candidate.

Members of Legislative Assembly

Election Result

Assembly Elections 2019

References

Assembly constituencies of Maharashtra